Willie Perdomo is a Puerto Rican poet and children's book author. He is the author of The Essential Hits of Shorty Bon Bon (Penguin Poets, 2014), a National Book Critics Circle Awards finalist, Where a Nickel Costs a Dime (W. W. Norton & Company, a Poetry Society of America Norma Farber First Book Award finalist, 1996), Postcards of El Barrio (Isla Negra Press, 2002), and Smoking Lovely (Rattapallax Press, 2003), which received a PEN Beyond Margins Award.  His children's book, Visiting Langston, received the Coretta Scott King Honor. Perdomo was also the recipient of a New York Foundation for the Arts Poetry Fellowship in 2001 and 2009. He is a Pushcart Prize nominee, and recently was a Woolrich Fellow in Creative Writing at Columbia University. He is co-founder/publisher of Cypher Books, a VONA/Voices faculty member, and is currently an instructor in English at Phillips Exeter Academy. He is married to Emmy Award-winning journalist and writer, Sandra Guzman.

Awards and honors
2014 National Book Critics Circle Award (Poetry) finalist for The Essential Hits of Shorty Bon Bon

See also

 List of Puerto Rican writers
List of Puerto Ricans
 Puerto Rican literature

References 

American male poets
American children's writers
American people of Puerto Rican descent
Living people
Year of birth missing (living people)
Puerto Rican writers
Phillips Exeter Academy faculty